Inquisitor vulpionis is a species of sea snail, a marine gastropod mollusk in the family Pseudomelatomidae, the turrids. It belongs to Neogastropoda. Members of the order Neogastropoda are mostly gonochoric and broadcast spawners.

Description
The length of the shell varies between 20 mm and 35 mm.

Distribution
This marine species occurs off the Philippines and Japan.

References

 Kuroda, T.; Habe, T.; Oyama, K. (1971). The sea shells of Sagami Bay. Maruzen Co., Tokyo. xix, 1-741 (Japanese text), 1–489 (English text), 1-51 (Index), pls 1-121

External links

 
 

vulpionis
Gastropods described in 1971